Hitlers Bombe (Hitler's Bomb) is a nonfiction book by the German historian Rainer Karlsch published in March 2005, which claims to have evidence concerning the development and testing of a possible "nuclear weapon" by Nazi Germany in 1945. The "weapon" in question is not alleged to be a standard nuclear weapon powered by nuclear fission, but something closer to either a radiological weapon (a so-called "dirty bomb") or a hybrid-nuclear fusion weapon. Its new evidence is concerned primarily with the parts of the German nuclear energy project under Kurt Diebner.

Summary
Under supervision of the SS, from 1944–45, German scientists in Thuringia tested some form of "nuclear weapon", possibly a dirty bomb (for the differences between this and a standard fission weapon, see nuclear weapon design). Several hundred prisoners of war are alleged to have died as a result. Karlsch's primary evidence are alleged vouchers for the atomic weapon attempts, a preliminary plutonium bomb patent from the year 1941 (which had been known about, but not yet found), and conducted industrial archaeology on the remains of the first experimental German nuclear reactor.

Follow-up research
In February 2006, full tests on the soil at the proposed test site were released by the Physikalisch-Technische Bundesanstalt (PTB), revealing no abnormal background levels of radiation after taking into account the already elevated background levels as a result of the Chernobyl accident in 1986. The PTB release emphasized that while it could not necessarily rule out a German test conclusively, that soil analysis of that site revealed absolutely no evidence of it.

Criticism
Karlsch has been criticized for displaying "a catastrophic lack of understanding of physics" by physicist Michael Schaaf, who is himself the author of an earlier book about Nazi atomic research, while Karlsch himself has acknowledged that he lacked absolute proof for the claims made in his book.

See also 

 German nuclear weapons program

Notes

References
 Rainer Karlsch - Hitlers Bombe (DE, DVA, March 2005) 
 Rainer Karlsch - Hitlers Bom (NL, Lannoo, November 2005) 
 Rainer Karlsch - Hitlers Bombe (DE, dtv, June 2007) 
 Rainer Karlsch - Hitlers Bombe (DE, Waxmann, October 2007) 
 Rainer Karlsch - La Bombe de Hitler (FR, Calmann-Lévy, October 2007)

External links

New light on Hitler's bomb
Did Hitler Have the Bomb?
'Nazi nuke' sketch unearthed
Historian's claims of a Nazi atomic bomb causes controversy
Soil analysis results from the Physikalisch-Technische Bundesanstalt (in German)

World War II weapons of Germany
Nuclear program of Nazi Germany
2005 non-fiction books
History books about World War II
Books about Nazism
Radiological weapons